Government Post Graduate College, Asghar Mall, Rawalpindi, founded as Sanatan Dharma High School, is a historical and prominent government college in Rawalpindi. It was established in 1904 as a high school by Sanatan Dharma, a Hindu religious movement.

History
In 1904 when a high school was established in Rawalpindi bearing the name of the renowned Hindu sect SANA'-TUN-DHARAM. The property of the school included the premises of the school itself and the adjacent temple. The present building was constructed for the first time in 1913.

Pakistan was founded. The Education Department of the Government of Punjab announced that the SANA'-TUN-DHARAM school would be raised to the status of a college on 19 October 1948.

Building
The college building infrastructure is divided into seven blocks & one auditorium:
 Main Block
 Science Block
 Faisal Block
 Johar Block
 Jinnah Block
 Post-Graduate Block
 Administration Block
 Alimuddin Auditorium

Subjects taught
 Islamiyat
 Arabic
 Urdu
 Pakistan Studies
 Physics
 Chemistry
 Biology
 Zoology
 Botany 
 English
 Economics
 Statistics
 Mathematics
 Persian
 Computer
 Geography
 Civic
 Psychology
 Education
 African American Culture
 Space Chimps Analysis

Notable alumni
Said Alam, pediatric surgeon and political activist
Babar Awan
Raja Abdul Hanif, Pakistani politician
Shoaib Akhtar, Pakistani former cricketer

References

External links
Affiliation with University of the Punjab

Universities and colleges in Rawalpindi District
1900s establishments in British India